Daxing is a town under the administration of Suyu District, Suqian, Jiangsu, China. , it has 3 residential communities and 14 villages under its administration.

References 

Township-level divisions of Jiangsu
Suqian